Natália Kodajová (born 21 July 1968) is a Slovak swimmer. She competed in two events at the 1996 Summer Olympics.

References

External links
 

1968 births
Living people
Slovak female swimmers
Olympic swimmers of Slovakia
Swimmers at the 1996 Summer Olympics
Sportspeople from Žilina